The meridian 70° west of Greenwich is a line of longitude that extends from the North Pole across the Arctic Ocean, North America, the Atlantic Ocean, the Caribbean Sea, South America, the Pacific Ocean, the Southern Ocean, and Antarctica to the South Pole.

The 70th meridian west forms a great circle with the 110th meridian east.

From Pole to Pole
Starting at the North Pole and heading south to the South Pole, the 70th meridian west passes through:

{| class="wikitable plainrowheaders"
! scope="col" width="120" | Co-ordinates
! scope="col" width="150" | Country, territory or sea
! scope="col" | Notes
|-
| style="background:#b0e0e6;" | 
! scope="row" style="background:#b0e0e6;" | Arctic Ocean
| style="background:#b0e0e6;" |
|-
| 
! scope="row" | 
| Nunavut – Ellesmere Island
|-
| style="background:#b0e0e6;" | 
! scope="row" style="background:#b0e0e6;" | Nares Strait
| style="background:#b0e0e6;" |
|-
| 
! scope="row" | 
| Inglefield Land, Saunders Island and Wolstenholme Island
|-
| style="background:#b0e0e6;" | 
! scope="row" style="background:#b0e0e6;" | Baffin Bay
| style="background:#b0e0e6;" |
|-
| 
! scope="row" | 
| Nunavut – Baffin Island
|-
| style="background:#b0e0e6;" | 
! scope="row" style="background:#b0e0e6;" | Hudson Strait
| style="background:#b0e0e6;" |
|-
| 
! scope="row" | 
| Nunavut – High Bluff Island
|-
| style="background:#b0e0e6;" | 
! scope="row" style="background:#b0e0e6;" | Hudson Strait
| style="background:#b0e0e6;" |
|-
| 
! scope="row" | 
| Nunavut – Diana Island
|-
| style="background:#b0e0e6;" | 
! scope="row" style="background:#b0e0e6;" | Diana Bay
| style="background:#b0e0e6;" |
|-
| 
! scope="row" | 
| Quebec
|-
| style="background:#b0e0e6;" | 
! scope="row" style="background:#b0e0e6;" | Saint Lawrence River
| style="background:#b0e0e6;" |
|-
| 
! scope="row" | 
| Quebec
|-
| 
! scope="row" | 
| Maine
|-
| style="background:#b0e0e6;" | 
! scope="row" style="background:#b0e0e6;" | Atlantic Ocean
| style="background:#b0e0e6;" | Gulf of Maine
|-
| 
! scope="row" | 
| Massachusetts – Cape Cod and Monomoy Island
|-
| style="background:#b0e0e6;" | 
! scope="row" style="background:#b0e0e6;" | Atlantic Ocean
| style="background:#b0e0e6;" | Nantucket Sound
|-
| 
! scope="row" | 
| Massachusetts – Nantucket Island
|-
| style="background:#b0e0e6;" | 
! scope="row" style="background:#b0e0e6;" | Atlantic Ocean
| style="background:#b0e0e6;" |
|-valign="top"
| 
! scope="row" | 
| Island of Hispaniola – passing just west of Santo Domingo (at )
|-
| style="background:#b0e0e6;" | 
! scope="row" style="background:#b0e0e6;" | Caribbean Sea
| style="background:#b0e0e6;" |
|-
| 
! scope="row" | 
|
|-
| style="background:#b0e0e6;" | 
! scope="row" style="background:#b0e0e6;" | Caribbean Sea
| style="background:#b0e0e6;" |
|-
| 
! scope="row" | 
|
|-
| 
! scope="row" | 
|
|-
| 
! scope="row" | 
| Amazonas
|-
| 
! scope="row" | 
|
|-
| 
! scope="row" | 
| Loreto Region – for about 16 km
|-valign="top"
| 
! scope="row" | 
| Amazonas Acre – from )
|-valign="top"
| 
! scope="row" | 
| Madre de Dios Region Puno Region – from ) Tacna Region – from )
|-
| 
! scope="row" | 
|
|-
| 
! scope="row" | 
| For about 8 km
|-
| 
! scope="row" | 
|
|-
| 
! scope="row" | 
|
|-
| 
! scope="row" | 
| For about 8 km
|-
| 
! scope="row" | 
|
|-
| 
! scope="row" | 
|
|-
| 
! scope="row" | 
|
|-
| 
! scope="row" | 
|
|-
| style="background:#b0e0e6;" | 
! scope="row" style="background:#b0e0e6;" | Straits of Magellan
| style="background:#b0e0e6;" |
|-valign="top"
| 
! scope="row" | 
| Isla Grande de Tierra del Fuego, Thompson Island, Waterman Island and Hoste Island
|-
| style="background:#b0e0e6;" | 
! scope="row" style="background:#b0e0e6;" | Pacific Ocean
| style="background:#b0e0e6;" |
|-
| style="background:#b0e0e6;" | 
! scope="row" style="background:#b0e0e6;" | Southern Ocean
| style="background:#b0e0e6;" |
|-valign="top"
| 
! scope="row" | Antarctica
|-
|}

See also
69th meridian west
71st meridian west

w070 meridian west